Joudaim (جوددائم, ital. Oliveti) is a town in Libya northeast of Zawiya, noted during the push of the National Liberation Army on their way to "27km" crossing, before entering Tripoli. On 21 August 2011, a Sky News report stated that Joudaim had been taken by anti-Gaddafi forces as they advanced towards Tripoli as part of the 2011 Libyan civil war.

The area is heavily forested and was host to several Arab Region Scout Jamborees.

References 

http://wikimapia.org/#lat=32.7942735&lon=12.8200579&z=16&l=0&m=b&v=8

Populated places in Zawiya District